The council (or synod) of Constantinople that took place in the Great Church on 20 July 518 affirmed the Council of Chalcedon of 451 and denounced its opponents. It was held by the Patriarch John the Cappadocian in response to the pleas of the people following the accession of the Emperor Justin I. This was a decisive shift in the Christological attitude of the imperial church.

An allegedly eyewitness account of the council was incorporated into the Acts of the council of Constantinople of 536 under the title "How the Synods Were Proclaimed in the Church" in the fifth session.

Notes

Bibliography

518
518
Constantinople